Ugartsthal, a former German colony in the Kingdom of Galicia and Lodomeria which is today part of the village Sivka-Kaluska in Kalush Raion (Ivano-Frankivsk Oblast, Ukraine), is located  west of Kalush.

Description
In the 19th century around the colony to the north laid Wierzchnia and Mościska, to the east Kalush, to the south Siwka, on the west - a village Kropiwnik. Through the centre of village flowed the Kropiwnik stream; through northern part flows Froniłów or Fornelów; left inflow of Kropiwnik Buildings of the village lie near the border of Siwka (Mt. 316 m.). The village composed one commune with Siwka. 

In 1880 there were 62 houses, 423 inhabitants in the commune, (43 Greek-Catholic, 3 Roman-Catholic, 365 Protestants, 12 Israelites; 14 Poles, 43 Rusins (Ruthenian, old name for the Ukrainians), 366 Germans). The Evangelical Parish in the place from 1784, the church from 1788 . To the parish belongs 3320 souls. Branches: Landestreu, Nowica, and Petranka. In the village there is a religious school and communal loan-society (Earning Cashier) with capital 535 złr.

The Ugartsthal name of the village, and other similar localities (e.g. Ugartsberg) originate from the name of the contemporary Austrian margrave of Moravia, Alois Ugarte. 
The German settlements were established on the base of so-called Josephine colonization.

The name of Ugartsthal was changed by Polish administration in the late 1930s to Tespowo.

The village of Landestreu changed at the same time the name to Mazurówka.

In the Samuel Bredetzky's register in Ugartsthal there are found 63 families, (327 "souls" - persons). Pastorate embraced following localities: Ugartsthal, Landestreu, Kałusz, Neu-Dolina, Engelsberg, Horocholina, Wełdzirz, Stanisławów, Bohorodczany, Grabowiec, Sołotwina, Nowica, Petranka, Krasna.

See also
Galician Germans
List of German - French names of places in Alsace
List of German - French names of places in Lotharingia
Church of the Holy Apostles in Rumania
 Map of German settlements in Galizien, 1939

References 
 Wielki Słownik Geograficzny Królestwa Polskiego, Warszawa 1880

The count Alois Ugarte was an owner of the palace in Kravsko, Czech Rep.
See:  Alois Graf von und zu Ugarte ( d. 1845) was in  1787 – 1802 a Governor (Statthalter) of Moravia (a separate Austrian crownland, German: Markgrafschaft Mähren) – see: Governors of Moravia
 Herman Schick in his Memories of the Parish Ugartsthal – Landestreu („Zeitweiser der Galiziendeutschen 1976", published also in Newsletter No. 6 of Galizien German Descendants) writes „that Ugartsthal was named after Herr von Ugart, the owner of the lands where the original 40 farms had been laid out"
 Herman Schick, Memories of the Parish Ugartsthal – Landestreu („Zeitweiser der Galiziendeutschen 1976", published also in Newsletter No. 6 of Galizien German Descendants) – writes that Tespowo comes from the abbreviation TESP, that is Towarzystwo Eksploatacji Soli Potasowej – the Company for Exploration of Salt Mines in Kalusz
 Gedenkbuch zur Erinnerung an die Einwanderung der Deutschen in Galizien vor 150 Jahren, Poznań 1931,
 Ludwig Schneider, Das Kolonisationswerk Josefs II. in Galizien, Leipzig 1939. English translation by Leona Rosenmeier (published in GGD #15, July 1998).
 Geschichte der Deutschen in den Karpathenländern by Kaindl, Raimund Friedrich

External links
 GALIZIEN GERMAN DESCENDANTS This E-group is to share information between the Galizien German Descendants searching for their family history. Galicia (Galizien, Galicja), a former Austrian province, was a part of South - East Poland, today Western Ukraine Galicia (Eastern Europe)
 Location of Siwka - Ugartsthal
Location of Siwka - Ugartsthal
Map of District (povit) of Kalush (Kalusz
Ukrainian Museum in Kropyvnik
Samuel Bredetzky

Merged settlements in Ukraine
Kalush Raion
Former German settlements in Ivano-Frankivsk Oblast
Populated places in the Kingdom of Galicia and Lodomeria
German culture in diaspora